Yelena Aleksandrovna Grudneva (born 21 February 1974) is a retired Russian gymnast. She competed at the 1992 Summer Olympics in all artistic gymnastics events and won a gold medal with the Unified Team. Individually her best result was ninth place on the balance beam. She won a bronze medal on the uneven bars in Nantes at the European championships in 1992.

Competitive history

Competitor for CIS

References

1974 births
Living people
Soviet female artistic gymnasts
Russian female artistic gymnasts
Gymnasts at the 1992 Summer Olympics
Olympic gymnasts of the Unified Team
Olympic gold medalists for the Unified Team
Olympic medalists in gymnastics
Medalists at the 1992 Summer Olympics
Medalists at the World Artistic Gymnastics Championships